Michael Bert Thornton (born February 9, 1954) is an American lawyer who serves as a senior judge of the United States Tax Court.

Early life and education 

Thornton was born on February 9, 1954, in Hattiesburg, Mississippi. He graduated [[Latin honors|summa cum laude]] from the University of Southern Mississippi with a Bachelor of Science in Accounting in 1976.  In 1977, he graduated from the same school with a Master of Science in Accounting.  In 1979, he graduated with a Master of Arts in English literature from the University of Tennessee. In 1982, he graduated with distinction with a Juris Doctor degree from Duke University School of Law, where he served on the Duke Law Journal, and was inducted into the Order of the Coif. He served as law clerk to Charles Clark, chief judge for the United States Court of Appeals for the Fifth Circuit from 1983 to 1984.

 Tax Court service 

Thornton was appointed by President Bill Clinton as Judge of the United States Tax Court on March 8, 1998, for a fifteen-year term ending March 7, 2013. He has served as Chief Judge since 2012 (save for the period from March 8 through August 6, 2013). He was subsequently renominated by President Barack Obama on May 9, 2013, for an additional fifteen-year term, which was confirmed by the Senate on August 1, 2013. He assumed senior status on January 1, 2021.

 Accomplishments and employment 

Practiced law as an Associate attorney, Sutherland Asbill & Brennan, Washington, D.C., summer 1981, and 1982–1983
Miller & Chevalier, Washington, D.C., 1985–1988
Served as Tax Counsel, United States House Committee on Ways and Means, 1988–1993
Chief Minority Tax Counsel, United States House Committee on Ways and Means, January 1995
Attorney-Adviser, United States Department of the Treasury, February–April 1995
Deputy Tax Legislative Counsel in the Office of Tax Policy, United States Department of the Treasury, April 1995 – February 1998
Recipient of Treasury Secretary's Annual Award, United States Department of the Treasury, 1997
Meritorious Service Award, United States Department of the Treasury, 1998

References

 Material on this page was copied from the website  of the United States Tax Court, which is published by a United States government agency, and is therefore in the public domain.''

|-

|-

|-

1954 births
Living people
20th-century American judges
21st-century American judges
Judges of the United States Tax Court
United States Article I federal judges appointed by Bill Clinton
University of Southern Mississippi alumni
University of Tennessee alumni
United States Article I federal judges appointed by Barack Obama
Duke University School of Law alumni